The 2020 Arkansas House of Representatives elections were held on November 3, 2020. Elections were held to elect representatives from all 100 House of Representatives districts across the U.S. state of Arkansas. It was held alongside numerous other federal, state, and local elections, including the 2020 Arkansas Senate elections.

Prior to the election, the National Conference of State Legislatures labeled this as one of many state and local races throughout the country that could effect partisan balance during post-census redistricting.

Republicans expanded their supermajority from 76–24 to 77–23, flipping the 9th and 11th districts, while Democrats flipped the 32nd district. While Arkansas was long a practically single-party state dominated by the Democratic Party during the Solid South, the rise of the Southern Strategy and the realignment of political parties has turned it and most other southern states into Republican strongholds. Republicans have controlled the House since the 2012 elections. Democratic strength is mostly isolated to Little Rock, the state capital and largest city, and Fayetteville, home to the University of Arkansas, as well as the Black Belt along the Mississippi Delta, with large populations of rural African Americans.

Predictions

Results

Overall

Closest races 
Seats where the margin of victory was under 10%:
 
  gain
  gain
  gain

District 1

District 2

District 3

District 4

District 5

District 6

District 7

District 8

District 9

District 10

District 11

District 12 
Democrat Jimmie L. Wilson narrowly won by 5 percentage points ahead of Republican David Tollett, but Wilson was unanimously ruled ineligible to serve as a State Representative by the Arkansas Supreme Court on October 26, 2020. Wilson was convicted of a misdemeanor 30 years earlier for "illegal use of federal farm loans and selling mortgaged crops." Despite being pardoned by President Bill Clinton in 2001, the court found a 2016 amendment to the Arkansas Constitution barring those who have been convicted of "deceit, fraud or false statement" from serving in public office barred Wilson from serving.

District 13

District 14

District 15

District 16

District 17

District 18

District 19

District 20

District 21

District 22

District 23

District 24

District 25

District 26

District 27

District 28

District 29

District 30

District 31

District 32

District 33

District 34

District 35

District 36

District 37

District 38

District 39

District 40

District 41

District 42

District 43

District 44

District 45 
According to Ballotpedia, the general election in the 45th House district was cancelled, with incumbent Republican Jim Wooten winning without appearing on the ballot.

District 46 
According to Ballotpedia, the general election in the 46th House district was cancelled, with incumbent Republican Les Eaves winning without appearing on the ballot.

District 47

District 48

District 49

District 50

District 51

District 52

District 53

District 54

District 55

District 56

District 57

District 58

District 59

District 60

District 61

District 62

District 63

District 64

District 65

District 66

District 67

District 68

District 69

District 70

District 71

District 72

District 73

District 74

District 75

District 76

District 77

District 78

District 79

District 80

District 81

District 82

District 83

District 84

District 85

District 86

District 87

District 88

District 89

District 90

District 91

District 92

District 93

District 94

District 95

District 96

District 97

District 98

District 99

District 100

See also
 2020 Arkansas elections
 2020 Arkansas Senate election

References

External links
 
 
  (State affiliate of the U.S. League of Women Voters)
 

Arkansas House of Representatives
House of Representatives
Arkansas House
Arkansas House of Representatives elections